Geniostoma macrophyllum is a species of plant in the Loganiaceae family. It is endemic to Fiji.

References

Endemic flora of Fiji
macrophyllum
Near threatened plants
Taxonomy articles created by Polbot